Bukit Batok Bus Interchange is an interchange bus station located at Block 631 Bukit Batok Central, Singapore, near West Mall Shopping Centre and Bukit Batok MRT station. The sheltered concourse is built underneath a multi-storey carpark similar in design to the old Serangoon Interchange.

The interchange has two vehicular concourse areas, North and South. The North concourse features five sawtooth berths, two of which are used for alighting and the remaining three for boarding, with queuing lanes installed. Buses park at a bus park opposite the passenger concourse, and separate ingress and egress lanes lead to Bukit Batok Central.

The South concourse features fifteen end-on berths, which are shared among five bus services. Two end-on berths are reserved for wheelchair boarding and alighting. A combined ingress and egress lane cuts underneath the interchange and leads to a junction with Bukit Batok Central. Both concourses are able to accommodate double-deck buses. It is currently operated by Tower Transit Singapore, which operates 10 services under the Bulim Bus Package.

History
The interchange was officially opened on 27 September 1987 and began operations two days later. It took over a terminal along Bukit Batok West Avenue 3.

In 1995, the bus package for all services (77, 173, 189, 361, 365, 367) was drawn under Bukit Batok Bus Package, and services were handed over between 18 June 2000 and 26 December 2000 from Singapore Bus Services to Trans-Island Bus Services which is now SMRT Buses. 61 was transferred from Paya Lebar Bus Package and 106 was transferred from Serangoon Bus Package in 2000.
 
In 2016, Tower Transit Singapore took over services 77, 106, 173, 177, 189, 941, 945, 947, 990 from SMRT Buses and operates the interchange under the Bulim Bus Package.

In 2018, SBS Transit took over service 852 from SMRT Buses under the Seletar Bus Package.

In 2021, Tower Transit Singapore took over service 944 from SMRT Buses under the Bulim Bus Package (2nd term).

Accident
On 11 July 2021, 17 people were injured after two buses collided at the bus interchange causing a bus to crash through the fence and landed on its side 2m down to adjacent ramp at around 5:05 pm. The bus driver was arrested the following day for a rach act causing grievous hurt with investigations being done.

Bus Contracting Model

Under the new bus contracting model, as all the bus routes are under the Bulim Bus Package, 61 and 991 come under the Choa Chu Kang-Bukit Panjang Bus Package. 852 comes under the Seletar Bus Package (SBS Transit). Bus service 944 was previously allocated to Bulim Bus Package under SMRT Buses. From 29 May 2021, Bus Service 944 is operated by Tower Transit Singapore, after the Land Transport Authority awarded the contract for the second term of Bulim Bus package to Tower Transit Singapore in September 2020.

See also
 Bus transport in Singapore

References

External links
 Interchange/Terminal (SMRT Buses)
Bukit Batok Town Map & Services Guide

Bus stations in Singapore
Bukit Batok
1987 establishments in Singapore